The 2021 Southeast Missouri State Redhawks football team represented Southeast Missouri State University as a member of the Ohio Valley Conference (OVC) during the 2021 NCAA Division I FCS football season. Led by eighth-year head coach Tom Matukewicz, the Redhawks compiled an overall record of 4–7 with a mark of 4–2 in conference play, tying for second place in the OVC. Southeast Missouri State played home games at Houck Stadium in Cape Girardeau, Missouri.

Previous season

The Redhawks finished the 2020–21 season with 4–4 overall record and 4–3 in conference record to finish in fourth place in OVC.

Schedule

References

Southeast Missouri State
Southeast Missouri State Redhawks football seasons
Southeast Missouri State Redhawks football